The 2013 Sky Blue FC season was the team's fourth season of existence. Sky Blue played the 2013 season in National Women's Soccer League, the top tier of women's soccer in the United States.

Background
The foundation of the National Women's Soccer League was announced on November 21, 2012, with Sky Blue FC selected as a host for one of the eight teams.

Match results

Regular season

Playoffs

Standings

Results summary

Results by round

Team

Roster

Statistics

Appearances and goals

Source: Sky Blue FC Player Stats

Top scorers
Players with 1 goal or more included only.

Source: Sky Blue FC Player Stats

Disciplinary record
Players with 1 card or more included only. 

Source: Sky Blue FC Player Stats

Goalkeeper stats

Last updated: 31 August 2013

Source: Sky Blue FC Player Stats

Honors and awards

NWSL Awards

NWSL Yearly Awards

NWSL Monthly awards

NWSL Weekly awards

See also
 2013 National Women's Soccer League season
 2013 in American soccer

References

Sky Blue FC
Sky Blue FC
NJ/NY Gotham FC seasons
Sky Blue